Together at Christmas may refer to:
 Together at Christmas (Etta Jones and Houston Person album)
 Together at Christmas (Michael Ball and Alfie Boe album)